A strike paper, strike bulletin or strike newspaper is a news publication started by participants in a strike action.

A 1983 Finnish nursing strike started a strike paper to efficiently communicate with its members.

In popular culture 
Papergirl by Melinda McCracken is a novel about a girl who distributes the strikers' newspaper during the 1919 Winnipeg general strike.

Examples 

 The Citizens' Voice (1978–present), Wilkes-Barre, Pennsylvania
 Press Connection (1977–1980), Madison, Wisconsin
 Sōgi News (1932), Kyushu, Japan

References 

Paper
Newspapers by type